Pro Wrestling Illustrated (PWI) is an American internationally sold professional wrestling magazine that was founded in 1979 by publisher Stanley Weston. PWI is headquartered in Blue Bell, Pennsylvania, and published by Kappa Publishing Group. The magazine is the longest published English language wrestling magazine still in production. PWI publishes bi-monthly issues and annual special issues such as their "Almanac and Book of Facts". The magazine recognizes various world championships as legitimate, similar to The Ring in boxing.

PWI is often referred to as an "Apter Mag", named after its long-time photographer Bill Apter, a term used for wrestling magazines that keep kayfabe. In recent years, the PWI has moved away from reporting on storylines as actual news and mixed in editorial comments on the behind-the-scenes workings of wrestling.

Since 1991, PWI has been publishing its annual "Top 500 Wrestlers" listing the top male wrestlers in the world. In 2008, they added an annual "Top 50 Female Wrestlers" list, which was later expanded and renamed to the "Top 100 Female Wrestlers" list in 2018. In 2020, they added an annual "Top 50 Tag Teams" listing the top tag teams in the world.

History
The first issue of Pro Wrestling Illustrated (PWI) was released in 1979. The magazine soon became known for not breaking kayfabe in its articles as it traditionally treated all "angles", or storylines, as real. However, in more recent years the magazine has taken an editorial approach between kayfabe and "shoot" writing, differentiating between on-screen feuds and controversies behind the scenes. PWI is not limited to covering only prominent professional wrestling promotions, as it also covers multiple independent promotions in the United States. PWI also published other special issues, which included: PWI Wrestling Almanac & Book of Facts since 1996, Women of Wrestling, and a weekly newsletter entitled PWI Weekly from 1989 to 2000. The magazine was eventually acquired by Golden Boy Enterprises.

Yearly awards

PWI has given out annual awards and recognitions since its inception. These awards had previously been given out by another Victory Sports Magazine property, Sports Review Wrestling. PWI has also given out monthly rankings for big promotions, some select independent promotions, and overall rankings in singles and tag teams divisions. Additionally, readers are given the ability to vote for the winners of the year-end awards with ballots being included in special year-end issues. A special PWI Awards Magazine is issued annually, which reveals winners and the number of votes counted. The following is a list of categories in which PWI has issued awards.
Wrestler of the Year (since 1972)
Tag Team of the Year (since 1972)
Match of the Year (since 1972)
Feud of the Year (since 1986)
Most Popular Wrestler of the Year (since 1972)
Most Hated Wrestler of the Year (since 1972)
Most Improved Wrestler of the Year (since 1978)
Most Inspirational Wrestler of the Year (since 1972)
Rookie of the Year (since 1972)
Stanley Weston Award (since 1981)
Comeback of the Year (since 1992)
Woman of the Year (1972 to 1976, re-established in 2000)
Manager of the Year (1972 to 1999)
Midget Wrestler of the Year (1972 to 1976)
Announcer of the Year (1977)

World championship status

Historical recognition
Although many wrestling organizations promote their lead title as a world heavyweight championship, Pro Wrestling Illustrated (PWI) has only recognized a few championships as valid world titles at any one time. PWI has also generally recognized any tag team title from a promotion with a recognized world heavyweight championship as a world tag team championship and certain other select titles from those promotions as world championships.

In 1983, PWI withdrew world title recognition from the WWF World Heavyweight Championship, citing how champion Bob Backlund was not facing contenders from outside the World Wrestling Federation (WWF) territory and was only facing rulebreakers. This coincided with the WWF's withdrawal from the National Wrestling Alliance (NWA) in summer 1983. PWI reinstated the WWF's world title recognition in 1985 on account of the WWF's massive mainstream media profile.

The AWA World Heavyweight Championship was stripped of its world title status in January 1991 when the American Wrestling Association (AWA) was in its final days. By this time, the championship was vacant and would remain so until the promotion's closure. 

Until March 1991, PWI and its sister publications steadfastly referred to World Championship Wrestling (WCW) as "the NWA" despite WCW having increasingly phased out the latter name in the preceding months. In spring 1991, the family of magazines adopted a new policy of referring to the current promotion and its champions as WCW and the promotion's pre-1991 past as the NWA. The magazine also announced it would refer to the overall history of the promotion's world title as the "NWA/WCW World Championship" (and likewise with other WCW championships). PWI generally traced the lineage of the NWA/WCW World Championship back to George Hackenschmidt's title victory in 1905, rather than the creation of the NWA Worlds Heavyweight Championship in 1948. Subsequently, after Ric Flair left WCW and was stripped of the WCW World Heavyweight Championship in July 1991, PWI and its sister publications nonetheless continued to recognize the WCW title as held by Lex Luger, Sting, Vader, and Ron Simmons as the rightful continuation of the historic NWA Worlds Heavyweight Championship. When Masa Chono won an NWA world title tournament in Japan in August 1992, PWI and its sister publications only recognized Chono's title as the "NWA Championship" and rejected it as a world title or as a continuation of the historic NWA Worlds Heavyweight Championship.

PWI initially did not recognize the ECW World Heavyweight Championship as a world title but granted the championship and the promotion world title status in 1999.

Current recognition
Since 2021, Pro Wrestling Illustrated (PWI) recognizes the WWE Championship, WWE Universal Championship, AEW World Championship, Impact World Championship, ROH World Championship, MLW World Heavyweight Championship, and NWA Worlds Heavyweight Championship from the United States, the AAA Mega Championship and CMLL World Heavyweight Championship from Mexico, as well as the IWGP World Heavyweight Championship, Triple Crown Heavyweight Championship, World of Stardom Championship, and GHC Heavyweight Championship from Japan as world heavyweight championships. PWI later additionally recognized the independent wrestling titles the Independent Wrestling World Championship and the Pan-Afrikan World Diaspora Wrestling Championship as world championships.

List of all recognized world heavyweight championships

According to the annual PWI almanac, PWI still recognizes select world title reigns from May 4, 1905 – January 28, 1946, before the formation of the National Wrestling Alliance (NWA) in July 1948.

Rankings

PWI 500
PWI has published the list of the top 500 professional wrestlers each year since 1991 in an annual special edition magazine, the PWI 500. PWI writers choose the position of the wrestler following a designated evaluation period starting from mid-June; anything a wrestler accomplished before or after that period is not considered. They follow a criterion that includes win–loss record, championships won, quality of competition, major feuds, prominence within a wrestler's promotion(s), and overall wrestling ability. , Jushin Thunder Liger has appeared in the most editions of the PWI 500, with 29 appearances. In 1993, Miss Texas (Jacqueline Moore) was the first woman to be ranked in the list at No. 249. Since 2008 men and women have their separate lists, but some female wrestlers are still occasionally listed in the PWI 500.

PWI Women's 150
PWI has published a list of the top female professional wrestlers each year since 2008 in a special edition magazine, the Women's 100 (formerly known as Female 50). As with the list of male professional wrestlers, PWI writers choose the position of the wrestler following a designated evaluation period starting from mid-June; anything a wrestler accomplished before or after that period is not considered. In 2018, after ten years of the list including 50 wrestlers, it was expanded to 100 and renamed from Female 50 to Women's 100 and expanded to 150 in 2021.

PWI Tag Team 100
PWI published a list of the top tag team in 2020. PWI writers choose the position of the wrestler following a designated evaluation period starting from October; a minimum of 10 matches or 4 months as a tag team is required. The ranking included both male and female tag teams.

References

Further reading
2005 Pro Wrestling Illustrated Wrestling Almanac & Book of Facts.

External links

 
Monthly magazines published in the United States
Sports magazines published in the United States
Magazines established in 1979
Magazines published in Pennsylvania
Professional wrestling magazines